The 2008 East West Bank Classic was a women's tennis tournament played on outdoor hard courts. It was the 35th edition of the East West Bank Classic, and was part of the Tier II Series of the 2008 WTA Tour. It took place at the Home Depot Center in Carson, California, near Los Angeles, United States, from July 21 through July 27, 2008. Fourth-seeded Dinara Safina won the singles title and earned $95,500 first-prize money

Finals

Singles

 Dinara Safina defeated  Flavia Pennetta, 6–4, 6–2
It was Dinara Safina's 2nd title of the year, and her 7th overall.

Doubles

 Yung-jan Chan /  Chia-jung Chuang defeated  Eva Hrdinová /  Vladimíra Uhlířová, 2–6, 7–5, [10–4]

External links
 Official website
 Tournament draws

East West Bank Classic
LA Women's Tennis Championships
East West Bank Classic